Armando Ronca (13 September 1901 – 19 March 1970) was an Italian architect who has executed numerous buildings and interior designs, mainly in South Tyrol, Trentino and Milan.

Life 
Armando Ronca studied engineering in Genoa, Turin and Padua. In the mid-1930s, Ronca moved to South Tyrol, and influenced significantly the architecture of Bolzano and Merano until well into the 1960s.

Selected projects 

 1935: Villa Cembran, Merano
 1938–40: Palazzo del Turismo (Cinema Corso), Bolzano (demolished 1988)
 1952: "Rainerum" institute, Bolzano
 1955: Extension of the "San Siro" football stadium, Milan
 1959: "Eurotel" hotel complex, Merano
 1964: "INA-Casa" residential complex, Bolzano
 1970: Pius X church, Bolzano

Exhibitions 
 2017: Armando Ronca, Architektur der Moderne in Südtirol, 1935–1970, Kunst Meran / Merano Arte, Merano

Bibliography 
Flavio Schimenti. Armando Ronca. Memorie di Architettura a Bolzano e in Alto Adige, 1929–1969, Praxis 3, Bolzano 1999
Kunst Meran, Andreas Kofler, Magdalene Schmidt, Jörg Stabenow (eds). Armando Ronca: Architektur der Moderne in Südtirol, 1935–1970, Zürich 2017
Roman Hollenstein: "Mailand in den Alpen". In Neue Zürcher Zeitung, November 21, 2017, p. 36.

References 

20th-century Italian architects
Architects from Verona
1901 births
1970 deaths